Let's Hear It for the Boy is an album by American recording artist Deniece Williams released on April 16, 1984 by Columbia Records. The album reached No. 10 on the Billboard Top R&B Albums chart and No. 26 on the Billboard 200 chart.

Production
Deniece Williams produced six of the album's tracks while George Duke produced the remaining four. The production of the album was completed in early May 1984 before the album was released a few weeks later.

Singles
The album's title track reached No. 1 in the US on the Billboard Hot 100, Hot Soul Singles, and Dance Club Play charts. On the UK Pop Singles chart, it peaked at No. 2. The song was written for the 1984 feature film Footloose and appears on its soundtrack. It was certified Platinum by the RIAA.

Other tracks from the album released as singles include, "Next Love", which reached No. 17 on the Billboard Hot Dance Club Play chart, and "Black Butterfly", which reached No. 22 on the Billboard Hot Soul Singles chart.

Critical reception

Stereo Review described Williams' performance upon the LP as "a delight" with "fine vocalizing".

Track listing

Personnel 

Vocals
 Deniece Williams – lead vocals, arrangements (2), backing vocals (1, 3, 6–10)
 George Merrill – backing vocals (1, 3, 5–9)
 Shannon Rubicam – backing vocals (1, 3, 5–9)
 Oren Waters – backing vocals (3, 9)
 Roosevelt Christmas III – backing vocals (5, 6)

Musicians
 George Duke – Memorymoog (1, 5), Prophet-5 (1, 4), Moog bass (1), LinnDrum programming (1, 6), keyboards (2), Rhodes (5), synthesizers (6), vocoder (6), special effects (6)
 Leon Pendarvis – synthesizers (3, 8, 9), arrangements (3, 7, 8, 9)
 Kevin Grady – synthesizers (3, 8, 9)
 Russell Ferrante – acoustic piano (3, 4, 8, 9), Rhodes (4)
  George Merrill – Roland Jupiter 8 (6), LinnDrum programming (6), arrangements (6)
 Jerry Peters – organ (10), arrangements (10)
 Paul Jackson Jr. – guitars (1, 3, 5, 7, 8, 9)
 Jeff Baxter – guitars (3, 7, 8, 9)
 Michael Sembello – guitars (4, 6)
 Nathan East – bass (3, 4, 7, 8, 9)
 Fred Washington – bass (5)
 Ricky Lawson – drums (3, 4, 5, 7, 8)
 Ricky Nelson – drums (9) 
 Paulinho da Costa – percussion (1, 3)
 Sheila E. – percussion (5)
 John Robinson – tom toms (6) 
 Ronnie Laws – tenor saxophone (2)
 Richard Elliot – lyricon (4)
 Hubert Laws – flute (5)
 George Del Barrio – string arrangements (2)

Production
 Larkin Arnold – executive producer 
 Bridget Bergman – make-up
 Nancy Donald – art direction 
 George Duke – producer (1, 4, 5 & 6)
 Murray Dvorkin – mix assistant (1)
 D.W. Enterprises – management
 Mitch Gibson – second engineer (4)
 Bernie Grundman – mastering at Bernie Grundman Mastering (Hollywood, California).
 Mick Guzauski – engineer (2–10)
 Constance Guzman – production assistant 
 Tony Lane – art direction 
 Margaret MacFarlane – photography
 Tom Perry – engineer (1–10)
 Nick Spigel – second engineer (1)
 Tommy Vicari – engineer (1–10), mixing (1–10)
 Deniece Williams – producer (2, 3, 7–10)

Chart performance

References

1984 albums
Deniece Williams albums
albums produced by George Duke
Columbia Records albums